The unincorporated community of Panoche is located along Panoche Road in the southern, rural part of San Benito County, California, United States. The community is about 2.7 driving miles east of County Route J1. The county seat, Hollister, is roughly  straight-line distance. The Fresno County line is about  distant to the northeast. The area encompassed by San Benito County continues just over  farther south where the south extent meets Fresno and Monterey counties.

The Panoche Inn is one of few area landmarks. The bar and restaurant is busy with motorcycle enthusiasts on weekends in sunny weather.  Some customers camp at Mercey Hot Springs or ride off-road vehicles at a nearby Bureau of Land Management tract. The adjacent private grass airstrip is also used by local glider pilots in spring and autumn by agreement with the Inn owners. On the drive from Interstate 5, motorists will pass Little Panoche Reservoir: about 12.6 straight-line miles distant at 7.6 degrees off true north.

Panoche Valley grasslands are frequented by a variety of bird species of special interest, including Golden Eagle, Mountain Plover, Ferruginous Hawk, Prairie Falcon, Merlin, Mountain Bluebird, Loggerhead Shrike, Burrowing Owl, and Long-billed Curlew. The valley provides critical habitat, especially in winter, for these birds. Mammals in the area include three federally endangered species; the San Joaquin Kit Fox, Giant Kangaroo Rat, and Nelson's Antelope Squirrel. American Badger is also native to the valley. Endangered reptiles in the valley includes Blunt-nosed Leopard Lizard.

It is thought that the name Panoche is derived from the local Indian word for a species of cane that once grew in the valley from which the Indians extracted panoche, a kind of sugar. It is believed that this is the origin for the name panocha, a popular Mexican and Filipino sugar (though processed somewhat differently from each other), and a pudding eaten during Lent in New Mexico and Southern Colorado.

The ZIP Code is 95043. The community is inside area code 831.

Politics
In the state legislature Panoche is located in the 12th Senate District, represented by Republican Anthony Cannella, and in the 30th Assembly District, represented by Democrat Luis Alejo.

Nearby features
 Mercey Hot Springs, California
 New Idria, California

Notes

External links
 BLM Panoche and Tumey Hills areas.
 Panoche Inn
 Three Rocks Research, Three Rocks Report, April 2006 Newsletter

Unincorporated communities in California
Unincorporated communities in San Benito County, California